Second Chance is the second studio release by Rhode Island-based singer-songwriter Marc Douglas Berardo. The songs are original songs by Berardo with a few exceptions. Berardo collaborated with Michael Branden to write "After the Show"; a song about the various carnival and circus workers that spent the off season in Gibsonton, Florida. The title track "Second Chance" was written Don Ojo Dunaway and released in 1995 by Rich Mountain Music.  Long Way home was written by Don Henley and Danny Kortchmar.

Jennifer Layton describing the songs in a review she wrote for Indie Music said,  "Imagine Bruce Springsteen stories as Glen Frey would tell them. Jackson Browne would kill to cover some of these songs."

Track listing
 "Old Field Lane Intro" 
 "Useless" 
 "Ventura County Skies"
 "Thin Air"
 "Franklinville"
 "After The Show" 
 "Burning"
 "Downtown"
 "Crow's Theme"
 "Long Way Home"
 "Into The Great Unknown" 
 "Second Chance" 
 "On The Last Day of Summer"

Personnel

Musicians
 Marc Douglas Berardo – vocals, acoustic guitar, percussion, keyboards, harmonies, banjo on Second Chance 
 Dick Neal – banjo, electric guitar, Dobro, mandolin
 Scott Berardo – Drums
 Pete Szymanski – bass guitars and Panasonic DA-7
 Nick Vitiello – percussion, congas, shaker, snare drum on Franklinville
 Chris Berardo – harmony vocals, harmonica, percussion
 Michael Branden – harmony vocals, acoustic guitar
 Mark Mirando – acoustic piano
 Charlene Maciejny – vocals on Downtown
 CJ Masters – pedal steel

Production
Produced by: Pete Szymanski, and Marc Douglas Berardo. Burning by Dick Neal 
Mixed by: Pete Szymanski and Marc Douglas Berardo at Hayloft Studios assisted by Dick Neal December 1999 to May 2000 
Recorded by: Michael Branden at Hayloft Studios, Milford, CT.
Mastered at 9West, Framingham, MA. June 2000

Artwork
Photography: Kim Mitchell
Design and Layout: Michael Brandon

References

2000 albums
Marc Douglas Berardo albums